Theta Scorpii (θ Scorpii, abbreviated Theta Sco, θ Sco) is a binary star in the southern zodiac constellation of Scorpius. The apparent visual magnitude of this star is +1.87, making it readily visible to the naked eye and one of the brightest stars in the night sky.

The two components are designated θ Scorpii A (officially named Sargas , the traditional name for the system) and B.

Nomenclature
θ Scorpii (Latinised to Theta Scorpii) is the system's Bayer designation. The designations of the two components as Theta Scorpii A and B derive from the convention used by the Washington Multiplicity Catalog (WMC) for multiple star systems, and adopted by the International Astronomical Union (IAU).

It bore the traditional name Sargas, of Sumerian origin. Another possible origin is Persian for Arrow Head سر گز. The name 'Sar Gaz' is used in Iran as a star name, and was used for timing irrigation water shares. In 2016, the IAU organized a Working Group on Star Names (WGSN) to catalogue and standardize proper names for stars. The WGSN decided to attribute proper names to individual stars rather than entire multiple systems.  It approved the name Sargas for the star θ Scorpii A on 21 August 2016 and it is now so included in the List of IAU-approved Star Names.

Properties

The primary (θ Scorpii A) is an evolved bright giant star with a stellar classification of F0 II. With a mass 3.10 times that of the Sun, it is radiating 1,400 times as much luminosity as the Sun from its outer envelope at an effective temperature of 6,294 K, giving it the yellow-white-hued glow of an F-type star. This star is rotating rapidly, giving it an oblate shape with an equatorial radius 19% larger than the polar radius. This rapid rotation suggests that it formed via the merger of a binary star system.

A magnitude 5.36 companion has been reported at an angular separation of 6.470 arcseconds, but subsequent observers have failed to detect it, so it probably does not exist. However, a secondary, designated θ Scorpii B, has been detected at an angular separation of 0.538 arcseconds in 1991 by the Hipparcos satellite.

Modern legacy
Theta Scorpii appears on the flag of Brazil, symbolising the state of Alagoas.

References

External links
Theta Sco

Scorpii, Theta
Binary stars
Scorpius (constellation)
F-type bright giants
Sargas
159532
086228
6553
Scorpii, 160
Durchmusterung objects